Henry Deane may refer to:

 Henry Deane (archbishop of Canterbury) (c. 1440–1503)
 Henry Deane (engineer) (1847–1924), Australian engineer
 Harry Deane (1846–1925), American baseball player
 Sir Bargrave Deane (Henry Bargrave Deane, 1848–1919), English judge

See also
Henry Dean (disambiguation)